The Defence Medal or Defense Medal may refer to: 

 Defence Medal (United Kingdom), British Commonwealth and Empire medal for service during World War II
 Australian Defence Medal, awarded since 2006
 Ciskei Defence Medal, awarded in the Republic of Ciskei from 1988 to 1994
 Civil Defence Medal, awarded in the United Kingdom and associated territories from 1961 to 2007
 Defence Medal 1940–1945, Norwegian medal for defence of Norway during World War II
 National Defence Medal, a French military decoration awarded since 1982
 Philippine Defense Medal, Philippine medal for resistance against the Japanese invasion between December 1941 and June 1942

See also